Wharram-le-Street is a village and former civil parish, now in the parish of Wharram, in the Ryedale district of North Yorkshire, England. Until the 1974 local government reorganisation Wharram-le-Street was part of the East Riding of Yorkshire. The village is on the B1248 road between North Grimston and the boundary with the present East Riding of Yorkshire unitary authority. In 1931 the parish had a population of 133.

The Church of England parish church of St Mary is late Anglo-Saxon. The nave and lower part of the west tower were built in the early or mid-11th century, in the last decades before the Norman conquest of England. The top of the tower is slightly later, representing the Saxo-Norman overlap architecture of the late 11th or early 12th century. The chancel arch is pure Norman, the north aisle was added in the 14th century and the chancel was rebuilt in 1862–64.

St Mary's is now a Grade I listed building. The parish is now part of a joint benefice with the parishes of East Lutton, Helperthorpe, Kirby Grindalythe, Weaverthorpe and West Lutton.

History 
The affix "le-Street" in the toponym refers to the fact that the village is beside the course of a former Roman road. The Domesday Book of 1086 records the manor as Warham. Wharram railway station on the Malton and Driffield Railway served the village from 1853 to 1950. On 1 April 1935 the parish was abolished and merged with Raisthorpe and Burdale and Wharram Percy to form Wharram.

References

Sources

External links

Villages in North Yorkshire
Former civil parishes in North Yorkshire
Ryedale